Please Help the Pore (also known as Please Help the Poor) is a 1912 American silent short drama starring William Garwood, Riley Chamberlin, Mignon Anderson, and Marie Eline.

External links

1912 drama films
1912 films
Thanhouser Company films
Silent American drama films
American silent short films
American black-and-white films
1912 short films
1910s American films